The Commander-in-Chief of British Forces in South Africa was the title of the British Army general who held command of British forces during the Second Boer War.

The Commander-in-Chief were:

Notes

References

Senior appointments of the British Army
Second Boer War